Kerdabad (also Romanized as Kerdābād and Kord Abad) is a village in Ernan Rural District, in the Central District of Mehriz County, Yazd Province, Iran. At the 2006 census, its population was 111, in 33 families.

References 

Populated places in Mehriz County